The Archdiocese of Przemyśl is a Latin Church ecclesiastical jurisdiction or archdiocese of the Catholic Church located in the city of Przemyśl in Poland.

History
 April 13, 1375: Established as Diocese of Przemyśl
 March 25, 1992: Promoted as Metropolitan Archdiocese of Przemyśl

Special churches
Minor Basilicas:
 Bazylika Panny Marii (Bazylika MB Bolesnej oo. Dominikanów), Jarosław
 Bazylika pw. Ducha Świętego, Przeworsk
 Bazylika pw. Trójcy Przenajświętszej, Krosno
 Bazylika pw. Trójcy Przenajświętszej, Leżajsk
 Bazylika pw. Wniebowzięcia Najświętszej Marii Panny, Stara Wieś

Leadership

 Archbishops of Przemyśl (Roman rite)
 Archbishop Adam Szal (since 2016.05.21)
 Archbishop Józef Michalik (1993.04.17 – 2016.04.30)
 Archbishop Ignacy Tokarczuk (1992.03.25 – 1993.04.17)
 Bishops of Przemyśl (Roman rite)
 Archbishop Ignacy Tokarczuk (1965.12.03 – 1992.03.25)
 Bishop Franciszek Barda (1933.11.25 – 1964.11.13)
 Bishop Anatol Nowak (1924.09.30 – 1933.04.05)
 Bishop Józef Sebastian Pelczar (1900.12.17 – 1924.03.28)
 Bishop Luca Solecki (1882.03.27 – ?)
 Bishop Mattia Hirschler (1870.06.27 – 1881)
 Bishop Adam Jasiński (1860.03.23 – 1862.03.03)
 Archbishop Francesco Saverio Wierzchleyski (1846.07.27 – 1860.03.23)
 Bishop Józef Tadeusz Kierski (1768–1783)
 Bishop Andrzej Mikołaj Stanisław Kostka Młodziejowski (1767.02.02 – ?)
 Bishop Walenty Franciszek Wężyk (1765–1766)
 Archbishop Wacław Hieronim Sierakowski (1742.05.25 – 1760.07.21)
 Bishop Waclaw Hieronim Sierakowski (1741–1760)
 Bishop Alexander Antoni Pleszowice Fredro (1724–1734)
 Bishop Krzysztof Andrzej Jan Szembek (1719.03.15 – 1724.09.11)
 Bishop Jan Kazimierz de Alten Bokum (1701.07.18 – 1719.07.30)
 Bishop Jan Stanisław Zbąski (1677.10.11 – 1688.12.06)
 Bishop Piotr Gembicki (1637 – ?)
 Bishop Andrzej Szołdrski (1635.08.14 – 1636.07.21)
 Archbishop Jan Wężyk (1619–1627)
 Archbishop Wojciech Baranowski (1585–1591)

Suffragan dioceses
 Rzeszów
 Zamość-Lubaczów

See also
Roman Catholicism in Poland

Sources
 GCatholic.org
 Catholic Hierarchy
  Diocese website

Roman Catholic dioceses in Poland
Roman Catholic Archdiocese
Religious organizations established in 1375
Roman Catholic dioceses established in the 14th century